Lame or LAME may refer to:

Music
 "Lame" (song) by Unwritten Law
 Lame (album) by Iame

People

 Ibrahim Lame (born 1953), Nigerian educator and politician
 Jennifer Lame, American film editor
 Quintín Lame (1880–1967), Colombian rebel
 Lame Kodra, pen name of Sejfulla Malëshova (1900–1971), Albanian politician and writer

Technology
 LAME, audio encoding computer software 
 Lame (armor), a single plate of a suit of armour
 Lame (kitchen tool), a blade for scoring bread loaves
 Licensed Aircraft Maintenance Engineer (LAME or L-AME), professional title and qualification

Other uses
 A limp or lameness, a leg impairment
 Lameness (equine) in horses
Any physical disability (by extension)
 Lame language, a Nigerian, Bantoid dialect cluster

See also
 Lamé (disambiguation)
 List of people known as the Lame
 Lago delle Lame, a lake in Liguria, Italy 
 Lamer, hacker slang term
 Lamestream media